The 2019 IIHF Challenge Cup of Asia was the 12th edition of the IIHF Challenge Cup of Asia, an annual international ice hockey tournament held by the International Ice Hockey Federation (IIHF). The tournament took place from 1 to 9 March 2019 at Malaysia National Ice Skating Stadium in Kuala Lumpur, Malaysia.

Last year's runner-up Thailand will not participate for the first time since the competition kicked off in 2008 and made their debut in Division III qualification tournament of the 2019 World Championships. Kuwait also participates in Division III qualification tournament and India unable to participate in the tournament due to lack of money. Only Oman returned after one year absence, bringing the number of participants reduced from nine to seven teams. Mongolia won the Challenge Cup of Asia for the second straight year, by defeating the Philippines in the final, while Singapore defeating hosts Malaysia, to win their first ever bronze medal in the tournament.

Participants

Group A

Group B

Match officials
4 referees and 6 linesmen were selected for the tournament.

Referees
  Yu Jin Ang
  Chi Hongda
  Johan Magnusson
  Mohamed Faris Hakimin Yusoff

Linesmen
  Yong Elbert Cheah
  Chee Seng Loh
  Edmond Ng
  Eishner Jigsmac Sibug
  Tam Weng-leong
  Heru Wardana

Preliminary round
All times are in Malaysia Standard Time (UTC+8).

Group A

Group B

Playoff round

Bracket

Quarterfinals

Semifinals

Bronze medal game

Final

Final ranking

Source: IIHF.com

Awards and statistics

Awards
Best players selected by the directorate:
Best Goalkeeper:  Paolo Spafford
Best Defenceman:  Batgerel Zorigt
Best Forward:  Wai Kin Tan
Source: IIHF.com

Scoring leaders

Source: IIHF.com

Goaltending leaders
Only the top five goaltenders, based on save percentage, who have played at least 40% of their team's minutes, are included in this list.

Source: IIHF.com

References

2018–19 in Asian ice hockey
IIHF Challenge Cup of Asia
IIHF Challenge Cups of Asia
International ice hockey competitions hosted by Malaysia
2019 in Malaysian sport